Corey Alexander Watman (born June 17, 1989) is a former professional offensive lineman in the Canadian Football League (CFL).

College football
Watman played college football for the Eastern Michigan Eagles.
After the 2012 CIS season, he was ranked as the 12th best player in the Canadian Football League's Amateur Scouting Bureau final rankings for players eligible in the 2013 CFL Draft.

Professional football

Saskatchewan Roughriders
Watman was drafted in the first round, fourth overall by the Saskatchewan Roughriders and signed with the team on May 30, 2013.

Toronto Argonauts
On February 9, 2016, on the first day of free agency, Watman signed with the Toronto Argonauts. He played for the team for two years before ending his career after playing in the 105th Grey Cup championship win in 2017.

References

External links
Toronto Argonauts bio

1989 births
Living people
Players of Canadian football from Ontario
Canadian football offensive linemen
Eastern Michigan Eagles football players
Saskatchewan Roughriders players
People from East Gwillimbury
Toronto Argonauts players